Mega Man Legends is an action-adventure shooter game released by Capcom. It is the first game in the Mega Man Legends sub-series of Mega Man games from Capcom, and the second major 3D polygonal Mega Man title released in the franchise, following Mega Man: Battle & Chase. It was released for PlayStation in 1997 in Japan, and in 1998 in North America. A Nintendo 64 port was released in 2000 with the same title, but it was renamed Mega Man 64 for the English release in 2001. It was also ported to Windows in 2001, and PlayStation Portable in 2005, the latter only in Japan. It was last released as a PS one Classic through North American PlayStation Network in 2015.

Legends stars a different spiritual incarnation of Mega Man named Mega Man Volnutt, the game's player character. Mega Man Volnutt is a "Digger," a person in charge of investigating ruins from a flooded Earth. During his journey with his friends, their ship crashes on Kattelox Island, where Mega Man confronts pirates attacking it to obtain its hidden treasure. As an action-adventure game, Mega Man Legendss gameplay is vastly different from that of the original series, despite sharing a few elements.

Mega Man Legends received a positive critical response due to the series' jump from 2D graphics to 3D. Ports for Nintendo 64 and Windows received negative comments for lacking updates from the PlayStation version, whose graphics were considered outdated by the time the ports were released. Mega Man Legends was followed by the prequel The Misadventures of Tron Bonne and a sequel titled Mega Man Legends 2.

Gameplay
Mega Man Legends differs greatly from the platforming gameplay of past Mega Man games, the main factor being the three-dimensional worlds, and three-dimensional movement therein. Unlike the original Mega Man series which are platform games, Legends is an action-adventure game with elements from Tomb Raider like the ability to grab onto and climb up ledges, a left/right dive maneuver, manual camera control, and lock-on targeting, the last of which was also featured in games such as The Legend of Zelda: Ocarina of Time. The player controls Mega Man Volnutt across the title, in which he has to complete different missions such as investigating ruins or fighting pirates. The player travels through a large world, with various dungeons that are explored in a certain order, as well as a town with non-player characters to talk to. The plot is revealed through cutscenes. 

Although the only way to move in the game is on foot, once Roll Caskett repairs a support car, she is able to directly take Mega Man to specific areas. In Legends, large gems called Refractors are used as a power source. Small shards of them can be exchanged for money, and in the game, enemies that are destroyed will often drop these Refractor Shards. When shards are picked up, the equivalent amount of Zenny, the game's basic unit of currency, is added automatically. The health of Mega Man can be increased through the game in the shops, while it can be recovered through packs bought at shops, obtaining orange cubes from defeated opponents, or by asking the character Data to recover Mega Man's health. Mega Man also has a Life Shield which reduces the damage that he can receive from enemies. The damage caused by enemies can also be reduced by obtaining upgrades to Mega Man's armor or his helmet. Mega Man's interactions with characters from the game can also affect the price of objects. If the player makes Mega Man be rude with characters, prices from objects will be increased and the dialogues with people will also change.

The power of Mega Man's main weapon, the Buster Gun, depends on the Buster Parts equipped. Buster Parts can be equipped to upgrade four stats of the Buster Gun; Attack (how strong it is), Rapid (how fast it fires), Range (how far the shots go), and Energy (how many shots can be fired before pausing). Buster Parts can be retrieved from stores or from dungeons. Additionally, Roll is able to create Buster Parts from unusable objects found in the ruins. Roll is also able to make weapons for the player, using specific combinations of parts that can be found in dungeons or bought in shops. Many of these weapons supplement the Buster Gun. The only way to refill them in the field is an item that can be bought, but only one can be carried. Only one special weapon can be equipped at a time, and the only way to switch is to talk to Roll, unlike the original series. Special weapons can be upgraded, and have five stats; Attack, Rapid, Range, Energy, and Special. In order to upgrade them, the player must pay a specific amount of Zenny.

Plot

Setting and characters 
The Legends series takes place on a flooded Earth. Because of the flooding, only a few sparse islands exist and energy sources are rare. To satisfy the increasing demand for energy to power up machinery, they use quantum refractors found in ancient ruins. Shards of these refractors are used as currency. However, the main goal of every person is to find the Mother Lode, an item of supposed infinite power that can fill the need for the energy in one swoop. Those who try to excavate these ruins are called "Diggers" ("Digouters" in the Japanese version), who have Spotters on the outside that use technology to map the Diggers' paths and help them avoid or defeat Reaverbots, hostile robots that patrol the ruins. The protagonist of the game is Mega Man Volnutt, a Digger living in an airship called Flutter. He lives there alongside Roll Caskett, his Spotter who is searching for her missing parents; Barrel Caskett, Roll's grandfather; and Data, a mysterious monkey that talks in gibberish only Mega Man himself can understand. The game's antagonists are the Bonne family, pirates who want to steal Kattelox's secret treasure in order to become rich. Teisel Bonne leads the group, his sister Tron Bonne builds most of their robots used in their elaborate schemes (and develops feelings for Mega Man), and the youngest brother, Bon Bonne, is either fully robotic or protected by a robot suit, and he can only say one word—"Babu!" The Bonne siblings are accompanied by forty Servbots, robots under the care of Tron. They live and travel in their flying warship, the Gesellschaft.

Story
On a tower ruin in the middle of the ocean, Mega Man retrieves a sizable blue refractor. Defeating the Reaverbots blocking his way out, he makes his way to the Flutter, which leaves the ruin. However, the Flutter experiences some engine problems and crashlands on Kattelox Island. From there, the Casketts try to find a way to repair their ship. However, when pirates attack Kattelox's city with giant mechanical weapons, Mega Man decides to stop them. Mega Man defeats the armored robots patrolling Downtown, led by Tron Bonne, and the ones laying a siege to City Hall, led by Bon Bonne. Their leader, Teisel, decides to attack the Clozer Woods ruins, but Mega Man defeats him as well. Kattelox's mayor, Amelia, tells Mega Man the Bonnes are searching for the island's secret treasure and that legend says if somebody obtains it, a great disaster will befall the island. Amelia asks Mega Man to investigate the island's ruins. In the Forest Ruins, Mega Man finds a large yellow Refractor. He uses this to power a boat in Uptown to access the Lake Ruins, defeating the Bonnes who had stolen the other boats and turned them into robotic weapons. Mega Man finds a huge red refractor in the Lake Ruins, which Roll and he use to repair the Flutter to access the entrance to the Clozer Woods ruins. Inside, Mega Man unlocks the island's largest ruin, the Main Gate, hoping to find the reason why Reaverbots from the island are being activated. On the way back, the Bonnes confront the Flutter with their mothership, but Mega Man overpowers them again and destroys the Gesellschaft.

When Mega Man explores the depths of the Main Gate, he unlocks Sub-Cities across the island. While exploring the three of them, he finds the Bonnes in the Old City and destroys their newest robot, a colossal monster named Bruno. Accepting defeat, the Bonnes leave him, though they plan to steal the treasure of the Main Gate once Mega Man gets it. After using the three keys from the Sub-Cities to access the depths of the Main Gate, Mega Man discovers a stasis chamber for the ancient robot Mega Man Juno, a 3rd class bureaucratic unit from Eden, a space station orbiting above the planet. Mega Man accidentally awakens Juno, who refers to Mega Man as "Mega Man Trigger", and realizes that Mega Man is suffering from memory loss. Juno claims that the island's population needs to be purged so it will be more controllable, and leaves Mega Man in a trap while he engages the program in the deepest depths of the ruin. Mega Man escapes the trap with help from Tron and Teisel and confronts Juno, and despite Juno upgrading to a giant form, Mega Man defeats him. Even with Juno's physical body gone, his last words transfer his backup data into the systems of Eden and confirm the Carbon Purification Process. Data gives new commands to the system, stopping the Purification and deleting Juno's backup data from Eden. Data then reveals to Mega Man that he contains all of his previous memories from when he was Mega Man Trigger. Mega Man had stored his memories into Data as a way to prevent Eden from ever tampering with it. Data promises to restore Mega Man's memory when the time comes. The residents proclaim Mega Man a hero and the Caskett family rides off in the repaired Flutter to continue their journey. Meanwhile, the Bonnes sail on a small boat built by Tron out of the scraps from the other robots, with the colossal refractor from the Main Gate in tow.

Development and release
Producer Keiji Inafune stated his purpose was to create a new Mega Man which would be completely different from all the others. Wanting that game to entertain gamers of all ages, Inafune decided to mix the action, RPG and adventure genres but wondered whether Mega Man Legends would still be entertaining. The humanoid characters in the game were all animated with motion capture. One of the earliest showings of Legends around the world took place at the Electronic Entertainment Expo in Atlanta, Georgia in June 1997 under the title Mega Man Neo. A demo of the game, titled  would later be included in the Japanese director's cut version of Resident Evil. The game was released in Japan on December 18, 1997, while a re-release with the label of "PlayStation the Best" was published on May 4, 1999.

In December 1997, Capcom USA's president, Bill Gardner, told IGN that Mega Man Legends would be ported to the Nintendo 64. Despite the Japanese name being already finalized, "Mega Man Neo" remained as an English name, with Gardner stating the title was not decided. In January 1998 the game was renamed "Mega Man Nova" as the general consensus did not find the previous name appealing, only to revert it just two weeks later due to trademark issues. The title Mega Man Legends was decided and confirmed in March 1998. By April 1998, the English adaptation of the game was finished, but Capcom decided to delay its release until September of the same year, believing it would fit better during the holiday seasons. The English localization removed an option from the original game in which Mega Man protects Tron from a dog chasing her; in the Japanese version, Mega Man can either kick or calm the dog, while in the English release he can only calm the dog. Other changes to the English version were the names of characters, such as the protagonist Mega Man Volnutt, whose Japanese name is Rock Volnutt.

The PC port of the game was first announced by Capcom at the Tokyo Game Show in April 2000 alongside Dino Crisis and Resident Evil 3: Nemesis. The PlayStation Portable version of Mega Man Legends was released in Japan on August 4, 2005. It was re-released on December 21, 2006, and January 29, 2009, with the latter also including the PSP port of Mega Man Legends 2. Although a North American release of the port was planned, it was cancelled. The PlayStation original became part of the PS one Classics program on September 29, 2015. Likely owing to licensing issues, this release is only available through North American PlayStation Network, limited to PlayStation 3 and PlayStation Vita.

The soundtrack was composed by Makoto Tomozawa. The sound designers found it a challenge to make the sounds for the game, with one of them, Toshio Kajino, having never worked on a Mega Man title. On February 21, 1998, Capcom published a CD of the game called . It contains a total of 40 tracks including the opening and ending themes. Tomozawa notes that the CD still lacks other tracks from the game due to the large number of tracks it had.

Reception

Since its release, Mega Man Legends has received moderately positive critical response from video game publications although the ports for Nintendo 64 and PC received from mixed to negative comments. GameRankings had an average of 73.73% for the PS version. The PC and Nintendo 64 version had lower averages of 33.67% and 63.94%, respectively. On Metacritic, the Nintendo 64 port holds an aggregate 59 out of 100 based on six reviews The jump from a 2D platform video game series to a 3D action-adventure game was well received, as reviewers compared it with other video game franchises whose changes were overall negative. Despite the change, critics liked how Legends shares various elements from the original Mega Man series. Game Informer liked the variations of Mega Man's special weapons as "There is plenty of shoot-em-up action for fans of traditional Mega Man titles." The storyline of the game was also praised, being labelled as "solid" by Game Informer and "engrossing" by GamePro, the latter praising the bosses characters as one of the best ones from the whole series. On the other hand, the game's difficulty received mixed reviews with focus on the boss battles, but praise in the addition of a tutorial mode later added to the Nintendo 64 port.

Next Generation reviewed the PlayStation version of the game, rating it three stars out of five, and stated that "first impressions can be a killer, and the game just doesn't possess the most outstanding graphics or mechanics to hook the merely curious after just one play. For those who look deeper, it's a diamond in the rough."

The N64 port, however, received criticism by Famitsu for being too similar to the original game. IGN commented that the PlayStation game "was a poor experience", asking "why Capcom [...] decided to make Nintendo 64 owners suffer through it unchanged". GameSpot thought that the graphics were outdated and that apart from not having any update from the original game, some music and sound clips were lost during conversion. The PC version received a more negative review; GameSpot gave it a "bad" 3.6 out of 10 stating gamers would find the PlayStation port more worthwhile. Similarly to Famitsus review of the Nintendo 64 port, GameSpot complained about the lack of additions to the PC port. The PC's conversions of the cutscenes during the game were found to have a mistake which makes a character start a dialogue while another one is still talking.

In a 2007 retrospective of the Mega Man series, Jeremy Parish of 1UP.com ranked Mega Man Legends as "Worth it!", with praise focused on the setting, the plot, the English voice acting and the boss battles. GamesRadar shared similar opinions, stating "it was a complete overhaul in every way" and noting that its jump to 3D graphics "seems totally lost in this day and age..." On the other hand, ScrewAttack placed Mega Man Legends fourth in their article, "Top Ten Worst 2D to 3D Games", with criticism focused in the game controls, the camera, and the main character's voice. Allgame mentioned that while the game "had some significant problems that kept it from being anything more than a diversion" with its most notable one being the controls which were improved in the sequel. Mega Man's design was third in GamePros "The 8 Worst Game Character Makeovers Ever" in which the author Patrick Shaw commented that having Mega Man without a helmet "just doesn't work". GamesRadar's article "Gaming's most absurdly oversized limbs" featured the game as an example of games with characters' oversized arms. In 2008, Joystiq's Wesley Fenlon listed Mega Man Legends as a potential game to be ported for the Wii with comments focused in the game's and the console's controls. In December 1998, a Capcom representative stated that Mega Man Legends became a very popular game.

Inafune stated that the game did not sell well, which he attributed to it being released years before sandbox games came into vogue.

Notes

References

External links

Rockman Dash official website (N64) 
Rockman Dash official website (PSP) 
Mega Man Legends at MobyGames

1997 video games
Action-adventure games
Action role-playing video games
Mega Man Legends
Nintendo 64 games
PlayStation (console) games
PlayStation Network games
PlayStation Portable games
PlayStation 3 games
Single-player video games
Third-person shooters
Video games developed in Japan
Video games set on fictional islands
Windows games